Leopold I (c. 1290 – 28 February 1326), called The Glorious, was Duke of Austria and Styria – as co-ruler with his elder brother Frederick the Fair – from 1308 until his death. A member of the House of Habsburg, he was the third son of Albert I of Germany and Elisabeth of Gorizia-Tyrol, a scion of the Meinhardiner dynasty.

Biography

After the death of his eldest brother Duke Rudolph III in 1307 and the assassination of King Albert in 1308, Leopold became administrator of Further Austria, where he started a retaliation campaign against his father's murderers. He converged with the royal House of Luxembourg and accompanied King Henry VII on his Italian campaign. In 1311, he helped to suppress a Guelph uprising in Milan under Guido della Torre, and to lay siege to the city of Brescia.

Upon Emperor Henry's death, he strongly supported his brother Frederick in the 1314 election as King of the Romans. Despite all efforts, the Habsburgs only gained the votes of four prince-electors, while Louis IV of Bavaria, with support of the Luxembourgs, was elected by five. In the following armed conflict between the rivals, the forces of Leopold were supportive of his brother's claims. In his ancestral homeland however, he incurred a decisive defeat by the Swiss Confederacy at the 1315 Battle of Morgarten.

When Frederick and their younger brother Henry had been captured at the Battle of Mühldorf in 1322, Leopold struggled for their release. He entered into negotiations with King Louis IV and even surrendered the Imperial Regalia he had kept at Kyburg Castle. The parleys failed and Leopold continued to attack the Bavarian forces of Louis, who unsuccessfully laid siege to the Swabian town of Burgau in 1324. After the king had failed to reach the approval of his election by Pope John XXII and was even banned, he released Frederick in 1325. The captive however had to promise to swear his brother to acknowledge Louis as his suzerain, which Leopold refused. Frederick voluntarily returned to the Bavarian court, where he and Louis finally agreed upon a joint rule.

Leopold died in Strasbourg shortly afterwards, on 28 February 1326. His remains were buried at Königsfelden Monastery in Windisch.

Marriage and issue
In 1315, Leopold married Catherine of Savoy (1284–1336), daughter of Amadeus V, Count of Savoy by his second wife, Marie of Brabant. They had two daughters:
Catherine of Austria (1320–1349), who married Enguerrand VI, Lord of Coucy.
Agnes of Austria (1322–1392), who married Bolko II, Duke of Świdnica.

References

Bibliography 

 Wurzbach, Constantin von (1860). "Habsburg, Leopold I. der Glorreiche". In Biographisches Lexikon des Kaiserthums Oesterreich. 6. Vienna: Kaiserlich-königliche Hof- und Staatsdruckerei, p. 409.
 ——— (1860). "Habsburg, Elisabeth von Savoyen". In Biographisches Lexikon des Kaiserthums Oesterreich. 6. Vienna: Kaiserlich-königliche Hof- und Staatsdruckerei, p. 165.

Leopold 1 of Austria
Leopold 1 of Austria
14th-century dukes of Austria
Leopold 1 of Austria
Leopold 1
Burials at Königsfelden Monastery
Sons of kings